This is a summary of 1918 in music in the United Kingdom.

Events
13 February – Cellist May Mukle and violist Rebecca Clarke give a recital at the Aeolian Hall, New York City, accompanied by Marjorie Hayward, performing works by Hubert Parry, Frank Bridge, and Clarke herself, including the premiėre of her Morpheus, written under the pen-name "Anthony Trent".
 August – Anglo-Welsh composer Philip Heseltine concludes a year's stay in Ireland with the writing of a number of songs which will be published under the pseudonym Peter Warlock.
29 September – The première of Gustav Holst's orchestral suite The Planets takes place before an invited audience at the Queen's Hall, London, with orchestra conducted by Adrian Boult.
December – Ralph Vaughan Williams is appointed Director of Music, First Army.

Popular music
Ivan Caryll – "Some Day Waiting Will End"
Harry Castling and Fred W. Leigh – "Where's Old Bill?"

Classical music: new works
 Kenneth J. Alford – The Vanished Army, march
 Arnold Bax
 String Quartet No. 1 in G major, GP. 199
 Symphonic Variations, GP. 210
 Frederick Delius – A Song Before Sunrise
Edward Elgar – Violin Sonata in E minor

Musical theatre
1 June – Tails Up!, a revue starring Jack Buchanan, opens at Comedy Theatre, London, where it will run for 467 performances.
5 August – Roses of Picardy, by Evelyn Thomas, opens at the Hippodrome, Cannock, before moving to the West End the following year.

Births
20 March – Marian McPartland, jazz pianist (died 2013)
16 April – Spike Milligan, comedian, writer, musician, poet and playwright (died 2002)
19 August – Dilys Elwyn Edwards, composer (died 2012)
22 September – A. J. Potter, composer (died 1980)

Deaths
15 January – Mark Sheridan, music hall performer, 53 (probable suicide by shooting)
13 April – David Ffrangcon Davies, baritone, 62
26 August – Cecil Coles, composer, 29 (killed in action)
7 September – Morfydd Llwyn Owen, singer, pianist and composer, 26 (complications from surgery for appendicitis)
7 October – Hubert Parry, composer, 70

See also
 1918 in the United Kingdom

References

British Music, 1918 in
Music
British music by year
1910s in British music